Braunsbedra is a town in the Saalekreis district, in Saxony-Anhalt, Germany. It is situated approximately 11 km southwest of Merseburg.

It was created after 1945 by the merger of Braunsdorf and Bedra. The town Braunsbedra consists of Braunsbedra proper and four Ortschaften (municipal divisions): Frankleben, Großkayna, Krumpa and Roßbach.

Roßbach, famous for the Battle of Rossbach, is one of the local communities; the layout of the land had greatly changed since the battle due to lignite mining and then flooding of the abandoned mines to create the Geisel valley Lakes complex.

References

Towns in Saxony-Anhalt
Saalekreis